MK Airlines Ltd. was a cargo airline from Ghana (registered in the United Kingdom from 2006 onwards, with its headquarters in Hartfield, East Sussex), which was operational between 1990 and 2010, concentrating on freight services to and from Africa. The airline routed most of its transported freight via its European bases at Gatwick Airport, Kent International Airport, Ostend–Bruges International Airport or Luxembourg-Findel International Airport. The African hub was located at OR Tambo International Airport, serving Johannesburg.

History

The airline was founded by Michael C. Kruger as MK Air Cargo d'Or in 1990 (MK stands for its founder's initials). Headquartered and registered in Ghana, a network of cargo flights with hubs at Kotoka International Airport and Gatwick Airport was set up, which was served with only one aircraft, a Douglas DC-8. In 1993, the MK Airlines branding was adopted.

Between 1995 and 1996, the headquarters of the airline were located in Nigeria. From 1999 onwards, MK Airlines expanded its fleet with cargo configured Boeing 747-200 airliners. The last of its DC-8s was put out of service in 2006.

In September 2006, MK Airlines was issued a new airline licence by the United Kingdom Civil Aviation Authority. In November 2007, plans for a rebranding of the airline as British Global were announced. The company had its airline code changed to BGB accordingly, but in March 2008, the rebranding was postponed indefinitely.

Due to financial problems, MK Airlines had to suspend all flight operations on 10 June 2008, and went into administration. After an investment had been received from Trans Atlantic Aviation, a subsidiary of the Belfairs Group, a limited extent of operations could resume on 20 June of that year. Following a reorganization of the airline's funding, bankruptcy administration could be left on 24 June 2009. Plans for an acquisition of more fuel-efficient aircraft of the Boeing 747-400 type could not be realized.

The financial burdens of the company could not be alleviated in the short term. On 9 April 2010, all operations ceased with surrender of the Air Operators Certificate to the UK CAA on the same day. An attempt was made to secure a company voluntary arrangement in order to be in a position to apply for a relaunch of operations. The CVA was successfully challenged by creditors as having been irregularly conducted and was rejected by the High Court of Justice on 5 October 2010.

Fleet
Over the years of its existence, MK Airlines operated the following aircraft types:

Accidents and incidents
On 15 February 1992, an MK Air Cargo d'Or (as the company was called at that time) Douglas DC-8 (registered 9G-MKB) crashed and subsequently caught fire while approaching Kano Airport on a flight from London. The five persons on board survived the accident.
On 17 December 1996, an MK Airlines DC-8 (registered 9G-MKD) struck trees upon approaching Port Harcourt International Airport following a flight from Luxembourg. The pilots did not manage to perform a go-around, and the aircraft touched down without being fully controlled, causing it to veer off the runway, thus being destroyed beyond repair. The four crew members remained uninjured.
On 27 November 2001, another MK Airlines aircraft (this time a Boeing 747-200 registered 9G-MKI) crashed when descending to Port Harcourt completing a cargo flight from Luxemburg in bad weather on short final. Nigeria's Ministry of Aviation produced a Civil Aviation Accident Report (FMA/AIPB/389) which found the pilot was using a nonstandard final approach on autopilot below . Of the thirteen persons on board, one died in the ensuing fire.
The crash of Flight 1602 on 14 October 2004 with its seven fatalities marks the worst accident in the history of MK Airlines. The aircraft involved, a Boeing 747-200 registered 9G-MKJ, did not get airborne upon take-off from Halifax Stanfield International Airport following a fuel stop en route to Zaragoza, Spain. The runway was overshot, and the airliner broke up and burst into flames. There were no survivors. TSB investigation into the accident revealed that the crew had used a wrong aircraft weight for calculating the necessary take-off thrust.

See also
 List of defunct airlines of the United Kingdom

References

External links

Defunct airlines of the United Kingdom
Defunct airlines of Ghana
Airlines established in 1990
Airlines disestablished in 2010
Ghanaian companies established in 1990
2010 disestablishments in Ghana